Mohammad Syful Islam (born 12 August 1946) is a Bangladeshi artist.

Early life and education
He was born in Meherpur to father Mohammad Naimuddin Biswas, a government official and Rahela Khatun. He had six other siblings, two brothers and four sisters. His family called him Hiller which later became Hitu. His father was an avid writer, who wrote several short novels and poetry. These writings were published in 1993 in Dhaka in the name of Kalsrot. From his childhood, Syful was very much fond of old classical Renaissance paintings, Russian and Chinese revolutionary paintings. He studied at Moscow School of Painting, Sculpture and Architecture in 1975.

Career

In 1975, opposing education ministry and foreign ministry's approvals- Bangobandhu Sheikh Mujibur Rahman, as President of Bangladesh sent him to Russia with a special fellowship for portrait painting training. The same year he was assassinated. Islam returned to Bangladesh the following year.

He did portraits of people such as AK Fazlul Huq, Maulana Bhashani, Rabindranath Tagore, Kazi Nazrul Islam and other famous personalities. His first commissioned work was the Kalema Tayyab in 1982.

A gold medalist in Bangladesh Calligraphy, Islam is also the former teacher of Prime Minister Sheikh Hasina. Besides being commissioned for completing the portraits of all Bir Sreshtho of the country, in addition to Chiefs of Staffs of the National Armed Forces, Islam has completed portraits for other foreign delegates and personalities. They include that of:

 Queen Elizabeth II of the United Kingdom
 Emperor and Empress of Japan
 King and Queen of Malaysia
 Emir of Kuwait

 Josip Broz Tito
 Kurt Waldheim
 Ronald Reagan
 Indira Gandhi

Personal life
He married Shahnaj Parveen in April 1975. She is from an Urdu-speaking family; her mother was from Kashmir and father was from Bombay. They have a son named Cézanne, after which his gallery is named.

References

External links
 Official Website
 Exhibition- Presenting the Sri Lankan scene Article by Daily Star

1946 births
Living people
Bangladeshi artists
Bangladeshi portrait painters
Moscow School of Painting, Sculpture and Architecture alumni